The Imperial Formation is the name of two distinct and unrelated geologic formations in North America, of different geologic Eras.

Separate formations

Canadian Paleozoic Era formation
The older Imperial Formation occurs in the Northwest Territories of Canada. It preserves fossils dating back to the Devonian period of the Paleozoic Era.

Californian Cenozoic Era formation
The younger Imperial Formation occurs in the Colorado Desert, in Imperial County of Southern California. It dates to the Zanclean−Lower Pliocene stage of the Pliocene Epoch, during the Neogene Period of the Cenozoic Era.

It underlies the Palm Spring Formation, and overlies the Ocotillo Formation.

See also

 List of fossiliferous stratigraphic units in California
 List of fossiliferous stratigraphic units in Northwest Territories

References

Devonian Northwest Territories
Pliocene California
Zanclean
Colorado Desert
Geology of Imperial County, California
Pliocene Series of North America
Geologic formations of California
Geologic formations of Canada
Paleozoic southern paleotemperate deposits
Devonian northern paleotropical deposits
Devonian southern paleotropical deposits
Carboniferous southern paleotemperate deposits